Zane Leo Scotland (born 17 July 1982) is an English professional golfer.

Scotland was born in Manchester and educated at The John Fisher School in Surrey. In 1997 he won a competition to find a British Tiger Woods. He went on to have a successful amateur career, winning several tournaments and gaining many representative honours, in addition to becoming the youngest English player ever to qualify for The Open Championship in 1999. He turned professional in 2003 but a car crash that resulted in an injury to his neck severely affected his early career.

Scotland finally earned his place on the European Tour by finishing inside the top 120 on the Order of Merit in 2007 despite having limited playing opportunities. However he failed to establish himself during his maiden season in 2008 and was back competing on the second tier Challenge Tour the following year. Scotland later played in lower-tier tours including PGA EuroPro Tour and the Dubai-based MENA Golf Tour, winning the MENA Tour's Order of Merit in 2013. Scotland played in the European Tour's Q School in 2013 and made it to the final stage, but finished 57th. Scotland has ten wins on the MENA Tour, the most by any player.

Scotland is the nephew of former Attorney General Baroness Scotland.

In March 2022, Scotland was appointed Diversity Ambassador to The Royal and Ancient Golf Club of St Andrews.

Amateur wins
2000 Peter McEvoy Trophy

Professional wins (11)

PGA EuroPro Tour wins (1)

MENA Tour wins (10)

Results in major championships

CUT = missed the halfway cut
"T" = tied
Note: Scotland only played in The Open Championship.

Team appearances
Amateur
European Youths' Team Championship (representing England): 2000 (winners), 2002
Jacques Léglise Trophy (representing Great Britain & Ireland): 1999 (winners), 2000 (winners)
St Andrews Trophy (representing Great Britain & Ireland): 2002 (winners)

References

External links

English male golfers
European Tour golfers
Sportspeople from Manchester
People from Wallington, London
1982 births
Living people